The 1935 South Sydney Rabbitohs season was the 28th in the club's history. The club competed in the New South Wales Rugby Football League Premiership (NSWRFL), finishing the season 2nd.

Ladder

Fixtures

Regular season

References 

South Sydney Rabbitohs seasons
South Sydney season